Donghae-1 gas field is a natural gas field located offshore in the Sea of Japan. It was discovered in 1997 and developed by Korea National Oil Corporation. The natural gas field is operated and owned by Korea National Oil Corporation. The total proven reserves of the Donghae-1 gas field are around 250 billion cubic feet (7.1×109m³), and production is centered on 50 million cubic feet/day (1.4×106m³).

References 

Natural gas fields in South Korea